János Kovács (13 March 1919 – 1982) was a Hungarian footballer who played as a forward.

Club career
Kovács played for several Hungarian clubs located in Romania, such as Nagyváradi AC, where he won the 1943–44 Nemzeti Bajnokság I and later with the same club but under a different name, IC Oradea, he won the 1948–49 Divizia A.

International career
On 6 June 1943, János Kovács played his only match for Hungary, being used by coach Kálmán Vághy in a friendly which ended with a 4–2 victory against Bulgaria.

Honours
Nagyváradi AC
 Nemzeti Bajnokság I: 1943–44
IC Oradea
 Divizia A: 1948–49

Notes

References

External links

János Kovács profile at Labtof.ro

1919 births
1982 deaths
Sportspeople from Timișoara
Hungarian footballers
Hungary international footballers
Association football forwards
Nemzeti Bajnokság I players
Nemzeti Bajnokság II players
Liga I players
Liga II players
FC Prahova Ploiești players
CAM Timișoara players
CA Oradea players
Expatriate footballers in France
Hungarian expatriate sportspeople in France